Matthew Csák or Máté Csák may refer to any of the following members of the genus of Csák:

 Matthew I Csák (d. 1245/1249)
 Matthew II Csák (c. 1235 – 1283/1284)
 Matthew III Csák (1260/65 – 1321)